Liu Ching-chung is a Taiwanese politician. He was Minister of the Hakka Affairs Council (HAC) from 30 July 2014 to 1 January 2016.

Early life
Liu was born in Pingtung County. He earned his bachelor's degree from the Department of Foreign Languages and Literature of National Chung Hsing University. He obtained his master's and doctoral degrees at the Department of Educational Administration and Foundations of Illinois State University in the United States.

Early career
Upon graduation, Liu worked at National Pingtung University of Education (NPUE), serving as Dean of the Graduate Institute of Education Administration, Deputy President, Acting President and President of the university. As NPUE President, he set up a Hakka research center to promote Hakka cultural research and development.

Hakka Affairs Council Political Deputy Minister
During his tenure as the Political Deputy Minister of the Hakka Affairs Council, Liu proactively assisted in the development of Hakka specialty industries and the management of Hakka cultural parks in Miaoli County and Pingtung County. He was also responsible for liaison and collaboration with Hakka affairs agencies of various local governments.

Hakka Affairs Council Minister
Liu was appointed as the acting Minister of the HAC on 1 July 2014 due to the sudden resignation of his predecessor, Huang Yu-cheng, from his post, citing the lack of time he had during his tenure to spend with his family at home. On 30 July 2014, he was officially appointed as the Minister of the HAC.

References

Political office-holders in the Republic of China on Taiwan
Living people
Taiwanese politicians of Hakka descent
Academic staff of the National Pingtung University of Education
Illinois State University alumni
National Chung Hsing University alumni
Taiwanese people of Hakka descent
Year of birth missing (living people)